The 2022–23 Merrimack Warriors men's basketball team represented Merrimack College in the 2022–23 NCAA Division I men's basketball season. The Warriors, led by seventh-year head coach Joe Gallo, play their home games at Hammel Court in North Andover, Massachusetts as members of the Northeast Conference.

The season will mark Merrimack's final year of a four-year transition period from Division II to Division I. As a result, the Warriors are not eligible to play in the NCAA tournament. However, a rule change made by the Northeast Conference allows the Warriors to compete in  the NEC tournament.

Previous season
The Warriors finished the 2021–22 season 14–16, 10–8 in NEC play to finish in fourth place. The Warriors, in their third year of a transition to Division I, were ineligible for the NEC tournament and the NCAA tournament. They received an invitation to play in The Basketball Classic, but their opponent, UMBC, withdrew from the tournament due to health concerns, unofficially ending their season.

Roster

Schedule and results

|-
!colspan=12 style=| Regular season

|-
!colspan=9 style=| NEC Tournament

Sources

References

Merrimack Warriors men's basketball seasons
Merrimack Warriors
Merrimack Warriors men's basketball
Merrimack Warriors men's basketball